Masao Yazawa (15 May 1915 – 11 December 2004) was a Japanese sprinter. He competed in the men's 200 metres and the men's 4 x 100 meters relay events at the 1936 Summer Olympics.

References

External links

1915 births
2004 deaths
Place of birth missing
Japanese male sprinters
Olympic male sprinters
Olympic athletes of Japan
Athletes (track and field) at the 1936 Summer Olympics
Japan Championships in Athletics winners